Ram Subhag Singh (7 July 1917 – 16 December 1980) was an Indian politician who was a member of the Indian National Congress. He served as a member of the 3rd and 4th Lok Sabha for Bikramganj and Buxar in the Bihar state of India in 1962 and 1967, respectively. After the split in the Congress party in 1969, he stayed with the Indian National Congress (Organisation). He was first leader of the opposition in the Lok Sabha in 1969. He participated in the Indian independence movement. He was a cabinet minister in the Union Government led by the Congress party.

Early life 
Singh was born in July 1917 in Ara district of the Bihar State in India. He undertook his primary education at the Government Town School, Ara Bihar, and his secondary education at Kashi Vidyapeeth, Varanasi, Uttar Pradesh. Singh went to the University of Missouri for completing his Ph.D. degree in journalism from the Missouri School of Journalism.

Activism and politics 
He participated in 1942 Quit India Movement along with Mahatma Gandhi. He was close aid of Jawahar Lal Nehru and he fought Parliamentary Election in 1952 from Sasaram Constituency of Bihar State and elected as Member of Parliament in First Loksabha. In 1957 he again got elected to Parliament from same constituency. In 1962 he won parliamentary seat of Bikramganj constituency in Bihar. In 1967 he fought the general election for the buxar constituency and was elected to parliament for a 4th time.

Positions held 

 Member of the Central Legislature for over 22 years consecutively.
Member of Parliament, 1948–1952.
 Provisional Parliament, 1950–1952.
 Member of Parliament, 1952–1957.
 Agriculturist and Journalist ; President, Shahabad District Canal (Nahar) Kisan Congress, 1952–1955.
 Member of Parliament, 1957–1962.
 Secretary, Congress party in Parliament, 1955–1962.
 Union Minister of State for Food and Agriculture, 1962–1964.
 Union Minister of Social Security & Cottage Industries, 9 June 1964 – 13 June 1964.
 Union Minister of State for Railways, 1964–1967.
 Union Minister of Parliamentary Affairs, 1967–1969.
 Union Minister of Communications and Information Technology, 1967–1969.
 Union Minister of Railways, 14 February 1969 – 4 November 1969.
 He was the Leader of India's first Opposition in the Lok Sabha, 1969–1970.

References 

Lok Sabha

1917 births
1980 deaths
India MPs 1962–1967
India MPs 1967–1970
Commerce and Industry Ministers of India
Indian National Congress (Organisation) politicians
Indian National Congress politicians
Leaders of the Opposition (India)
Lok Sabha members from Bihar
People from Buxar district
People from Rohtas District
Indian National Congress politicians from Bihar